Sebastiania eglandulata is a species of flowering plant in the family Euphorbiaceae. It was originally described as Omphalea eglandulata Vell. in 1831. It is native to Rio de Janeiro, Brazil.

References

Plants described in 1831
Flora of Brazil
eglandulata